The Cream & the Crock is a best-of compilation album by Australian rock band You Am I, released in 2003. It includes singles and album tracks from Sound as Ever (1993) up to Deliverance (2002). There are two versions: a single-disc standard edition (also called The Cream), featuring singles plus one album track; and the special edition, including a second disc (The Crock) of various album and extended play tracks, singles, B-sides, demos and two new tracks – "What They Do at Night" and "Mr Kermode & the Million Matches". The single-album version peaked at No. 12 on the ARIA Albums Chart. A related DVD-version, The Cream & the Crock, was issued in November of that year.

Track listing

The Cream and the Crock, double-album,

Charts

References

2003 greatest hits albums
You Am I albums
Compilation albums by Australian artists